The Cambridgeshire High School for Boys was founded as the Cambridge and County School for Boys in Cambridge, England, in 1900.

History
It was later the Cambridge and County High School for Boys, and then finally the Cambridgeshire High School for Boys. It had around 600 boys in 1970, with 150 in the sixth form. It was transformed into Hills Road Sixth Form College in the 1974 reorganisation of education in Cambridgeshire.

The Cambridgeshire High School for Girls became the Long Road Sixth Form College, also in 1974.

Former headmasters
 1900 Rev Charles John Napoleon Child
 1917 Peter Henderson (died 1917)
 1917 Rev Charles John Napoleon Child [acting head]
 1919 Major C. J. R. Whitmore
 1923 Arthur Brinley Mayne
 1946 Brinley Newton-John (father of Olivia Newton-John)
 1954 Arthur William Eagling
 1969 Colin W. Hill (subsequently Principal of Hills Road Sixth Form College, 1974–1984)

Alumni
 
 
 Martin Amis (author) records in his autobiography "Experience" that he attended the school while his father Kingsley Amis and his mother Hilary were living off Madingley Road.
 Roger 'Syd' Barrett of the rock band Pink Floyd attended the school. Barrett is remembered for the unprecedented way in which he resisted the school's strict code of conduct. 
 Charles Benstead, cricketer and Royal Navy officer
 Sir John Bradfield – Founder of Cambridge Science Park, the first Science Park in Europe.
 Peter Fluck, artist and sculptor, co-creator of the satirical TV show Spitting Image
 Sir Clive Granger, economist, won the Nobel Memorial Prize in Economic Sciences in 2003
 Bob Klose, early member of Pink Floyd.
 Prof Freddy Marshall, marine biologist, and Professor of Zoology from 1972–7 at Queen Mary, University of London
 David Parker, a Western Australian politician who served as Deputy Premier from 1988 until 1990.
 Sidney Peters, Liberal MP from 1929 to 1945 for Huntingdonshire
 Sir Hayden Phillips (former Permanent Secretary, Department for National Heritage/Department for Culture, Media and Sport, Lord Chancellor's Department/Department for Constitutional Affairs)
 Sir David Robinson
 William T. Stearn, botanist
 Sir Kevin Tebbit (former Permanent Secretary, Ministry of Defence
 The artist Storm Thorgerson was a contemporary and friend of Syd Barrett and Roger Waters. He was the co-founder of the Hipgnosis partnership, who designed record covers for, amongst others, Pink Floyd, Led Zeppelin, Yes, Genesis and Muse.
 Mark Tout, the British bobsleigher, was a member of the team which finished fifth at the Winter Olympics of 1994. In the team was second in the World Bobsleigh Championships. He subsequently made regular appearances as a team member on A Question of Sport.
 William (Bill) Tutte, mathematical genius responsible for breaking the Tunny Code (the Lorenz Code), at Bletchley Park in 1941. Tunny (also known as Fish) was an extensively-used German Second World War cypher more complex than the Enigma code, used by Hitler personally. Tutte went to Cambridgeshire High School on a scholarship in 1928, aged 11, and went on to Trinity College, Cambridge in 1935. After the war he was elected a Fellow of the Royal Society.
Roger Waters of Pink Floyd. The album The Wall allegedly draws heavily upon Waters' experience of the school. The Happiest Days of Our Lives, recalls the sadism of certain teachers, and Another Brick in the Wall part 2, which includes the famous lyrics "We don't need no education". In 2017, the 'Pink Floyd: Their Mortal Remains' exhibition at the Victoria & Albert Museum in London exhibited the punishment book for Cambridgeshire High School for Boys open at a caning for Roger Waters, along with the cane itself.

Former teachers
 Shaun Wylie, mathematician, who was one of the codebreakers at Bletchley Park during the Second World War. A photograph of him is on display in the National Portrait Gallery in London.

References

External links
 Old Boys' Society
 Photograph from 1900
 Old postcard

Educational institutions established in 1900
Schools in Cambridge
History of Cambridge
Defunct grammar schools in England
Educational institutions disestablished in 1974
Defunct schools in Cambridgeshire
1900 establishments in England
1974 disestablishments in England